Radovčići is a village in Croatia.

References

Populated places in Dubrovnik-Neretva County
Konavle